Dhakia is a village in Salarpur block, Budaun district, Uttar Pradesh, India. Its village code is 128277. Per the 2011 Census of India, the total population of the village is 1479: 802 males and 677 females. The village is administrated by Gram Panchayat.

References

Villages in Budaun district